PAEC may refer to:
 Pakistan Atomic Energy Commission
 Philippine Atomic Energy Commission
Pão de Açúcar Esporte Clube, Brazilian football club
Potential Alpha Energy Concentration